Zopfia is a genus of fungi in the family Zopfiaceae. The widespread genus contained 5 species, until another species was accepted.

The genus was circumscribed by Gottlob Ludwig Rabenhorst in Fungi europ. exsicc. no. 1734. in 1874.

The genus name of Zopfia is in honour of Friedrich (or Friederich) Wilhelm Zopf (1846–1909), who was a well-known German botanist and mycologist. He dedicated to his whole life with fungal biology, particularly in classification of fungi and dye production in fungi and lichens.

Species
As accepted by Species Fungorum;
Zopfia albiziae 
Zopfia caricis-firmae 
Zopfia pakistanica 
Zopfia rhizophila 
Zopfia rosatii 
Zopfia saitoi 

Former species;
 Z. bilgramii  = Ulospora bilgramii, Testudinaceae
 Z. biturbinata  = Pontoporeia biturbinata, Zopfiaceae
 Z. boudieri  = Rechingeriella boudieri, Zopfiaceae
 Z. cunninghamiae  = Neotestudina cunninghamiae, Testudinaceae
 Z. duplicispora  = Celtidia duplicispora, Zopfiaceae
 Z. insignis  = Rechingeriella insignis, Zopfiaceae
 Z. nicotiae  = Lepidosphaeria nicotiae, Testudinaceae
 Z. punctata  = Zopfiofoveola punctata, Zopfiaceae
 Z. terrestris  = Testudina terrestris, Testudinaceae
 Z. variospora  = Richonia variospora, Zopfiaceae

References

Pleosporales